The 2010 United States House of Representatives election in Delaware was held on November 2, 2010 to determine who would represent the state of Delaware in the United States House of Representatives for the 112th United States Congress. Democratic nominee former Lieutenant Governor, John Carney defeated Republican nominee Glen Urquhart, giving Delaware an all Democratic congressional delegation for the first time since before the 1942 midterms. This is the first open seat election since 1992 and only the second since 1976.

Overview

The state of Delaware is completely contained in a single at-large district. The district has a Cook Partisan Voting Index of D+7. Since 1993, the district had been represented by Republican Michael Castle.

Castle announced in 2009 he would run for the United States Senate seat held by Ted Kaufman (D) who had been appointed to the seat when his predecessor, Joe Biden (D), resigned to become Vice President. Castle was defeated by Christine O'Donnell in the Delaware Republican Senate primary.

Democratic primary

Candidates
John Carney, former Lieutenant Governor of Delaware

Results
Carney announced his candidacy on April 15, 2009 and was unopposed in the primary after Scott Spencer, a transportation consultant, dropped out.

Republican primary

Candidates
Glen Urquhart, businessman
Michele Rollins, businesswoman and former Miss District of Columbia USA and former Miss World America 1963
Rose Izzo, columnist

Results

Campaign
According to a September 2010 poll by Fairleigh Dickinson University's PublicMind, "likely voters in Delaware split 45%-40% on whether they prefer[ed] to have the U.S. Congress controlled by the Democratic Party or the Republican Party, suggesting that the First State's open congressional seat might be hotly contested," yet in the same poll, Carney led Urquhart by 51%-36%. Peter Woolley, the poll director, remarked that "candidates matter, not just parties" and that in Delaware candidates matter "more than in most states."

General election polling

General election

Results

References

External links
Election Commissioner at the Delaware Secretary of State
Official candidate listings
U.S. Congress candidates for Delaware at Project Vote Smart
Delaware U.S. House from OurCampaigns.com
Campaign contributions for U.S. Congressional races in Delaware from OpenSecrets
2010 Delaware General Election graph of multiple polls from Pollster.com

House - Delaware from the Cook Political Report
Delaware House Race from CQ Politics
Race profile at The New York Times
Election 2010 at The News Journal

Delaware
2010
United States House of Representatives